Jisr az-Zarqa ( lit. The blue bridge, ; often shortened as Jisr) is an Israeli Arab town on Israel's northern Mediterranean coastal plain. Located just north of Caesarea within the Haifa District, it achieved local council status in 1963. The name Jisr az-Zarqa is a reference to Taninim Stream, which is known in Arabic as the "Blue Wadi" (Wadi az-Zarka). The mayor is Az-Adin Amash.

Jisr az-Zarqa is the only Arab-majority town in Israel located on the coast of the Mediterranean Sea.

History

Excavations have revealed walls with pottery remains dating from the 1st CE, with amphoras dating from the 4th to 7th CE, and remains of a structure carrying a ceramic pipe, most probably dating to the Byzantine era. It has been suggested that the aqueduct in Jisr az-Zarqa is part of the aqueduct ending in Caesarea Maritima, but was never completed.

Ottoman era
The Jurban family was the first family coming from Jordan Valley, escaping due to conflict. Other main families are Amash from Qadum in West Bank, Najar from Al Arish or Egypt, Shihab from the Hauran, Twatcha and Um Bashi from Sudan.

In 1882, the PEF's Survey of Western Palestine (SWP) described it: “This is properly speaking a dam rather than a bridge, built across the river so as to form a large pool. There is a causeway on the top of the dam: the height on the west is 20 feet; on the east the level of the water was 3 feet below the roadway. The masonry resembles that of the aqueduct fed from the pool. [..] The eastern face of the dam is cemented. Sluices lined with cement are constructed in the dam. The roadway is 8 feet to 10 feet broad. The work appears to be Roman."

The SWP further noted: "There are small encampments of Arabs who live permanently in the marshes of the river Zerka. They are so strongly posted (the intricate way through the marshes being only known to themselves), that they are almost free from contributions to Government. They are known as 'Arab el Ghawarni."

A population list from about 1887 showed that Guwarnet ez Zerka had about 335 inhabitants, all Muslim.

British Mandate era

In the 1922 census of Palestine conducted by the British Mandate authorities, Jisr al Zarqa showed a population of 348 Muslims,   increasing in the 1931 census (when it was counted with Kabara) to 572 Muslims, in a total of 117 houses.

In the 1945 statistics the population of Arab el Ghawarina (Jisr Zerqa) was 620, all Muslims, while the total land area was 3,428 dunams, according to an official land and population survey. Of this, 6 were plantations and irrigable land, 674 for grain crops, while 69 dunams were classified as built-up (urban) areas.

Israeli period
Before the establishment of the state, it was inhabited by Bedouin of the Ghawarina tribe. The intervention of Jews from the neighboring towns of Zikhron Ya'akov and Binyamina, who relied on the population of Jisr az-Zarqa for agricultural labor, prevented the dispersal of its population in 1948.

In November 2002, the Caesarea Development Corporation constructed a large earthen embankment running the length of the 160 meter-wide corridor between Jisr az-Zarqa and neighboring Caesarea. The embankment was built to block noise from the muezzin in local mosques, celebratory gunfire, and to reduce property crime in surrounding communities. Residents of Jisr az-Zarqa claim that the national park in the north, the embankment to the south, the highway to the east and the sea to the west, are keeping the town from expanding.

The main coastal highway was built without providing an access to the village. However, a new interchange to Jisr az-Zarqa is being planned. The municipality of Jisr az-Zarka is seeking to promote environmental tourism to the town and its beachfront. The Israel National Trail, a cross-country trail that runs from Dan in the north to Eilat in the south, passes through Jisr az-Zarka. In 2013 it was reported that there were efforts to turn the town into a tourist destination

In 2011, a women's leadership program was established in the wake of a similar project in the nearby town of Fureidis, to encourage women's participation in political and public leadership positions.

Problems of pollution and overfishing in the coastal waters have affected the local economy, and many now work inland. From 20 to 30 buses transport on a daily basis Jisr az-Zarqa residents to jobs, mostly menial, in Haifa, Tel Aviv and elsewhere.

Demographics

The inhabitants of Jisr az-Zarqa are primarily Muslim.

In 2020, the Mossawa Center, which advocates for Arab-Israeli rights, stated that 80% of residents live below the poverty line. Unemployment is high, and those who hold down a job on average earn half the national average in terms of income. Additionally, the average income in the village is only about half that of the national average. In 2006 it had the highest school dropout rate in the country, at 12%. By 2020, less than a quarter (23%) of high school students went on to graduate.

A local resident, Mariam Amash, applied for a new identity card in Hadera in February 2008, using a birth document issued by the Ottoman Empire showing she was born in 1888. If verified by the Guinness Book of World Records, this would have made her the oldest living person in the world at 120. She died on December 22, 2012 at the age of 124.

In 1998, the first multiple kidney transplant in Israel took place between a couple from Jisr az-Zarqa and a Jewish couple from Jerusalem.

Culture
The film Al Jiser (2004) by Ibtisam Mara'ana examines the lives of residents of Jisr-az Zarka.

People from Jisr az-Zarqa
Taleb Tawatha

See also
 Arab localities in Israel

References

Bibliography

External links
 Welcome To Kh. Jisr al-Zarqa, Palestine Remembered
Survey of Western Palestine, Map 7: IAA, Wikimedia commons

Arab localities in Israel
Local councils in Haifa District